The year 1716 in architecture involved some significant architectural events and new buildings.

Events

 December 18 – James Gibbs joins the "Vandykes clubb", also called the Club of St Luke for "Virtuosi in London". Its members include William Kent and William Talman; other notable members with whom Gibbs would later work include the garden designer Charles Bridgeman and the sculptor John Michael Rysbrack who sculpts many of the memorials Gibbs designs.
 Jean-Baptiste Alexandre Le Blond becomes chief architect of Saint Petersburg in Russia.
 Italian architect and sculptor Carlo Bartolomeo Rastrelli relocates to Russia to work on a bust of Alexander Menshikov; he works there for the rest of his life.
 Nicholas Hawksmoor advises on the restoration of Beverley Minster in the north of England.

Buildings and structures

Buildings

 June 21 – Work begins on construction of the Codrington Library at All Souls College, Oxford, to the design of Nicholas Hawksmoor; it will be completed in 1751.
 America's first lighthouse, Boston Light, is built; it will be destroyed in the American Revolution and rebuilt in 1783.
 In Buenos Aires, Argentina, a monastery is built by Franciscan Recoleto monks; the complex will serve as a hospital during the English invasions.
 Schloß Oberhof, Grünstadt, Rhineland.
 Veltrusy Mansion, Bohemia, designed by František Maxmilián Kaňka.
 Lasha Great Mosque, Lhasa, Tibet.
 Work begins on Kneuterdijk Palace, in The Hague, Netherlands, built by Daniel Marot for the Count of Wassenaar-Obdam.

Births
 January 20 – Franz Wilhelm Rabaliatti, German court architect and builder (died 1782)
 January 30 – Carl Fredrik Adelcrantz, Swedish architect (died 1796)
 March 5 – Nicolò Pacassi, Austrian architect (died 1790)
 June 14 – Peter Harrison, English-born architect, active in the Rhode Island colony (died 1775)
 August 30 (bapt.) – Lancelot "Capability" Brown, English landscape architect (died 1783)
 date unknown – Sanderson Miller, English Gothic Revival architect and landscape designer (died 1780)

Deaths
 February 3 – Giuseppe Alberti, Italian Baroque painter and architect (born 1664)

References

architecture
Years in architecture
18th-century architecture